The 2014 World Junior Table Tennis Championships were held in Shanghai, China, from 30 November to 7 December 2014. It was organised by the Chinese Table Tennis Association under the auspices and authority of the International Table Tennis Federation (ITTF).

Medal summary

Events

Medal table

See also
2014 World Team Table Tennis Championships

References

World Junior Table Tennis Championships
World Junior Table Tennis Championships
World Junior Table Tennis Championships
World Junior Table Tennis Championships
Table tennis competitions in China
International sports competitions hosted by China
World Junior Table Tennis Championships
World Junior Table Tennis Championships